The American Palladium Eagle is the official palladium bullion coin of the United States. Each coin has a face value of $25 and is composed of 99.95% fine palladium, with 1 troy ounce actual palladium weight.

History
The Palladium Eagle was authorized by the American Eagle Palladium Bullion Coin Act of 2010 which became Public Law 111-303 passed during the 111th United States Congress in December 2010 and signed by President Barack Obama. 

The coin uses Adolph Weinman's obverse design on the Winged Liberty Head "Mercury" dime, Liberty wearing a winged hat, while its reverse design is based on Weinman's 1907 American Institute of Architects (AIA) medal design. The Mint was directed to obtain an independent study of whether there would be enough market demand to justify the issuance of the piece; it voided its first contract for such a study on learning that the contracted firm had ties to the palladium industry. The contract was re-awarded to New York-based CPM Group, which conducted the necessary research between May and July 2012. On , the Mint submitted a report to Congress based on the study, finding that demand would most likely not be sufficient to sustain a market in palladium bullion coins.

A bullion version sold directly to the United States Mint's authorized purchasers was released on September 25, 2017 and a proof version priced at $1,387.50 was released on September 6, 2018. Both offerings were met with a strong response; the 2017 bullion version sold out the day of release and within five minutes, sales of the 2018 proof version were suspended pending verification of the existing 14,782 of 15,000 maximum orders. Secondary market sales for the proof version were also strong on September 6 with many listings selling at a $600 premium over the Mint's asking price. A 2019 reverse proof version was released on September 12, 2019.

Mintage figures 

The mintage of the 2017 Bullion and 2018-W Proof finishes were limited to a maximum of 15,000 pieces each while the 2019-W Reverse Proof finish is limited to 30,000.

See also
American Silver Eagle – United States silver bullion coin program
America the Beautiful silver bullion coins – United States silver bullion coin program
American Buffalo (coin) – United States gold bullion coin program
American Gold Eagle – United States gold bullion coin program
American Platinum Eagle – United States platinum bullion coin program
Bullion
Bullion coin
Canadian Palladium Maple Leaf – Canadian palladium bullion coin program
Inflation hedge
Palladium as an investment

References

External links 

 American Eagle Palladium Bullion Coins and Proof Coins - United States Mint

Currencies introduced in 2017
Goddess of Liberty on coins
Eagles on coins
Bullion coins of the United States
Palladium bullion coins